Whetukamokamo H. Douglas (born 18 April 1991) is a New Zealand rugby union player who currently plays as a loose forward for Canterbury  in New Zealand's provincial rugby competition the Mitre 10 Cup.

Senior career

Douglas debuted for Waikato in a match against Horowhenua-Kapiti in 2013 and to the end of the 2016 Mitre 10 Cup season had made 36 National Provincial Championship and Ranfurly Shield challenge appearances and scored 8 tries.

He was named co-captain of Canterbury for the 2018 Mitre 10 Cup season.

In 2019 Douglas made a return to the Crusaders for the 2019 Investec Super Rugby season after a stint at Italian club Benetton.

International

He was named in the Māori All Blacks squad for their northern hemisphere tour in November 2016.

References

1991 births
Living people
Bay of Plenty rugby union players
Benetton Rugby players
Canterbury rugby union players
Crusaders (rugby union) players
Green Rockets Tokatsu players
New Zealand rugby union players
Ngāti Porou people
Ngāti Whakaue people
People educated at Gisborne Boys' High School
Rugby union flankers
Rugby union number eights
Rugby union players from Rotorua
Waikato rugby union players